Belgium has established numerous orders of knighthood, decorations and medals since its creation in 1830.
Below is a list of those awards.
The order of precedence is difficult to establish as Belgium does not keep an up-to-date listing with dormant and active awards. However, André Borné has established such a list that is used as a basis.

National orders
Orders on a grey background are dormant. Active orders are displayed on a white background.

Current awards and decorations

Military awards

Civilian awards

Military marching medals

Historical awards and decorations
These medals and decorations are currently no longer awarded.

Belgian Revolution (1830–31)

World War I (1914–1918)

Medals are shown in order of precedence.

World War II (1940–1945) and the Korean War (1954)
Medals are shown in order of precedence.

Other medals and awards
Awards and medals listed below are either obsolete or have never been awarded.

Commemorative medals

Belgian Red Cross

See also
 List of honours of Belgium awarded to heads of state and royalty

References

 Quinot H., 1950, Recueil illustré des décorations belges et congolaises, 4e Edition. (Hasselt)
 Cornet R., 1982, Recueil des dispositions légales et réglementaires régissant les ordres nationaux belges. 2e Ed. N.pl., (Brussels)
 Borné A.C., 1985, Distinctions honorifiques de la Belgique, 1830–1985 (Brussels)
 Van Hoorebeke, 2007, P., 175 Ans de l'Ordre de Léopold et les Ordres Nationaux Belges (MRA Brussels)
 André Borné, 1982, Honneur au travail: Distinctions honorifiques pour les travailleurs 1830–1980, (Brussels)

External links

 page on diplomatie.belgium.be
 

 
Belgium